Backdrop Ridge in an east–west ridge running to the north of The Stage on the north side of Renegar Glacier, Scott Coast, Antarctica. The ridge links the northern ends of the West, Central, and East Aisle Ridges, and was named by a New Zealand Geological Survey field party, 1977–78, led by D. N. B. Skinner, the name being derived from the ridge's position relative to The Stage.

References
 

Ridges of Victoria Land
Scott Coast